Dinmukhambet Salmukhambetovich Suleimenov (born 8 January 1981) is a Kazakhstani futsal player who plays as a defender for MFC Zhetysu and the Kazakhstan national futsal team.

Before joining MFC Zhetysu, Suleimenov played for AFC Kairat for ten seasons winning ten Kazakhstani Futsal Championships and two UEFA Futsal Cups with the club.

References

External links
The Final Ball profile

1981 births
Living people
Futsal defenders
Kazakhstani men's futsal players
People from Kentau